Immanuel Höhn (born 23 December 1991) is a German professional footballer who plays as a centre back for SV Sandhausen in the 2. Bundesliga.

References

External links
 

Living people
1991 births
Sportspeople from Mainz
German footballers
Association football defenders
Bundesliga players
2. Bundesliga players
BFV Hassia Bingen players
SC Freiburg players
SV Darmstadt 98 players
SV Sandhausen players